Evgeny Palenga (born January 27, 1993) is a Russian former professional ice hockey defenceman. He played one game for  HC Spartak Moscow in the Kontinental Hockey League during the 2010–11 KHL season.

References

External links 

1993 births
Living people
HK Brest players
Sokol Krasnoyarsk players
HC Spartak Moscow players
Sputnik Nizhny Tagil players
Russian ice hockey defencemen
Yermak Angarsk players